A blink refers to blinking, a rapid closing and opening of the eyelid.

Blink may also refer to:

Books
 Blink: The Power of Thinking Without Thinking, a psychology book by Malcolm Gladwell
 Blink (comics), a comic book character
 Blink (novel), a novel by Ted Dekker

Film and television
 Blink (1993 film), a neo-noir thriller film starring Madeleine Stowe and Aidan Quin about a blind musician
 Blink (2022 film), an American horror short film starring Sophie Thatcher
 Blink, a 2009 short movie starring Ben Foster
 "Blink" (CSI: NY)
 "Blink" (Doctor Who)
 "Blink" (Eureka)
 "Blink" (Law & Order: Criminal Intent)
 "Blink" (The 4400 episode)
 WNEW-FM or Blink 102.7, a short-lived New York City radio station from 2003

Music

Bands
 Blink (Irish band), an Irish band
 Blink. (American band), an American jazz fusion band
 Blink-182, an American pop-punk band
 Blink, fandom name of South Korean girl group Blackpink

Albums
 Blink (Plumb album), or the title song
 Blink (Revive album), or the title song

Songs
 "Blink" (Bad Gyal song), 2018
 "Blink" (Rosie Ribbons song), 2002
 "Blink" (U.V.U.K. song), 2012
 "Blink", a song by Meghan Trainor from her 2020 album Treat Myself

Computing and Internet
 Blink (browser engine), a web browser engine developed as part of the Chromium project by The Chromium Project
 Blink (SIP client), VoIP software
 Blink element (<blink>), an HTML tag
 Blink (community), an online community

Other
 Blink (airline), a UK airline
 Blink Home, a home automation company
 Charles Roberts (Canadian football) (born 1979), nicknamed Blink
 Equinox Fitness, which operates the Blink fitness brand
 Blink, a young adult publishing imprint of HarperCollins

See also
 Quantum dot blinking, or fluorescence intermittency